Detective is a 1979 Soviet action film directed by Vladimir Fokin.

Plot 
Yevgeny Kulik, returning from the army, went to work in the militia. He wanted to fight big criminals and one day his dream came true.

Cast 
 Andrey Tashkov as Kulik
 Boris Khimichev as Kolya
 Igor Kvasha as Klimov
 Nikolai Skorobogatov as Sorokin
 Yuri Gusev as Guladze
 Larisa Luzhina as Taisiya
 Aleksandr Pashutin as Shpunko
 Leonid Yarmolnik as Gnus
 Aleksey Zotov as Koshchey (as Aleksei Zotov)
 Nikolay Tyrin as Fomichov

References

External links 
 

1979 films
1970s Russian-language films
Soviet action films
1979 action films